The Federal Assembly was the federal parliament of Czechoslovakia from January 1, 1969 to the dissolution of Czechoslovakia on December 31, 1992. It was Czechoslovakia's highest legislative institution.

Chapter 3 of the 1960 Constitution of Czechoslovakia recognized it as "the supreme organ of state power and the sole statewide legislative body."

Constitution and practice
The Federal Assembly was divided into two equal chambers, the Chamber of People (Sněmovna lidu; other translation House of People) and the Chamber of Nations (Sněmovna národů; other translation House of Nations). The Chamber of the People reflected a system of proportional representation: in 1992 it included 99 deputies from the Czech Socialist Republic and 51 deputies from the Slovak Socialist Republic. The Chamber of Nations had 150 members, 75 from each republic. Deputies were selected through popular elections and served five year terms of office; all members of both houses served concurrently. However, before the Velvet Revolution — and thus, in all but the last two assemblies — there was only one party to vote for, National Front, and it was impossible to give a preferential vote.

The Post-Velvet Revolution electoral law, used to elect the last two assemblies, provided that both houses of the Federal Assembly would be elected by party-list proportional representation in multi-member electoral districts which correspond to the regions of each Republic. Seats for each Republic were allocated among its electoral districts on the basis of the votes actually cast in each. Voters must choose only one political party to vote for, but they may use up to four preferential votes for particular candidates of that party, which affect the final order of the candidates on the party list. To obtain seats, a party was required to obtain at least 5% of the Republic-wide votes in either of the Republics. The allocation of seats was made in two stages – first, seats were allocated within each electoral district using the Hagenbach-Bischoff quota. The remainders were then used to allocate any seats left unfilled on a republic-wide basis, again using the Hagenbach-Bischoff quota.

After an election each chamber met to select its own Praesidium consisting of three to six members. Together, the chambers elected the forty-member Presidium of the Federal Assembly, which served as the legislative authority when the assembly was not in session. A joint session of the Federal Assembly selected its chairman and vice chairman.

The Federal Assembly met in regular session at least twice a year, in the spring and fall. Legislation presented to the assembly at these sessions had to be approved by both chambers and in some cases required a majority vote by both the Czech and the Slovak deputies in the Chamber of Nations.

Constitutionally, the Federal Assembly was vested with great lawmaking powers, and had exclusive jurisdiction in all matters of foreign policy, fundamental matters of domestic policy, the economic plan, and supervision of the executive branch of government.

Before 1989, however, as in other Communist states, its function was largely confined to rubber-stamping measures placed before it by the Communist Party of Czechoslovakia (KSČ). Czechoslovak Laws passed under Communism were drafted in advance by the Presidium of the KSČ and presented to the Federal Assembly, which almost always approved them unanimously. The democratic centralist principle extended to elections as well. Voters were presented with a single list from the National Front (Národní fronta), an all-encompassing patriotic organization dominated by the Communists. Great pressure was brought to bear on citizens to turn out at the polls, and those who dared to cross out the name of the single Front-approved candidate on the ballot risked severe reprisals.  Under these circumstances, elections were almost always a formality, with the Front list winning well over 99 percent of the vote. Only after the Velvet Revolution did the Assembly assume actual power.

Building
The Assembly building was originally a stock exchange, designed by Jaroslav Rössler and completed in 1938. The space proved insufficient, and after a design competition Karel Prager was appointed to add an extension. He added a modern glass, metal and stone structure around and over the top of the original building.
The project was both expensive and controversial.

Between 1995 and 2008, The Federal Assembly Building housed the headquarters of Radio Free Europe/Radio Liberty. As of 2015, it houses the Federal Assembly National Museum.

Prager's design has since been copied elsewhere, for example in what is now the Bank of Georgia headquarters in Tbilisi.

Name changes

Presidents of the Federal Assembly
 Peter Colotka     January 30, 1969 - April 28, 1969
 Alexander Dubček  April 28, 1969 - October 15, 1969
 Dalibor Hanes     October 15, 1969 - December 9, 1971
 Alois Indra       December 9, 1971 - November 29, 1989
 Stanislav Kukrál  December 12, 1989 - December 28, 1989
 Alexander Dubček  December 28, 1989 - June 25, 1992
 Michal Kováč      June 25, 1992 - December 31, 1992

See also
List of chairmen of the Senate of Czechoslovakia
List of chairmen of the Chamber of Deputies of Czechoslovakia
List of chairmen of the Chamber of the Nations (Czechoslovakia)
List of chairmen of the Chamber of the People (Czechoslovakia)
List of chairmen of the National Assembly of Czechoslovakia

References

External links
 Joint Czech-Slovak Digital Parliamentary Library

 
Karel Prager buildings
1969 establishments in Czechoslovakia
1992 disestablishments in Czechoslovakia
Defunct bicameral legislatures